Mankato is a city in Blue Earth, Nicollet, and Le Sueur counties in the state of Minnesota. The population was 44,488 according to the 2020 census, making it the 21st-largest city in Minnesota, and the 5th-largest outside of the Minneapolis–Saint Paul metropolitan area. It is along a large bend of the Minnesota River at its confluence with the Blue Earth River. Mankato is across the Minnesota River from North Mankato. Mankato and North Mankato have a combined population of 58,763 according to the 2020 census. It completely encompasses the town of Skyline. North of Mankato Regional Airport, a tiny non-contiguous part of the city lies within Le Sueur County. Most of the city is in Blue Earth County.

Mankato is the larger of the two principal cities of the Mankato-North Mankato metropolitan area, which covers Blue Earth and Nicollet Counties and had a combined population of 103,566 at the 2020 census. The U.S. Census Bureau designated Mankato a Metropolitan Statistical Area in November 2008.

History

Mankato Township was not settled by European Americans until Parsons King Johnson in February 1852, as part of the 19th-century migration of people from the east across the Midwest. New residents organized the city of Mankato on May 11, 1858, the day Minnesota became a state. The city was organized by Johnson, Henry Jackson, Daniel A. Robertson, Justus C. Ramsey, and others. A popular story says that the city was supposed to have been named Mahkato, but a typographical error by a clerk established the name as Mankato. According to Warren Upham, quoting historian Thomas Hughes of Mankato, "The honor of christening the new city was accorded to Col. Robertson. He had taken the name from Nicollet's book, in which the French explorer compared the 'Mahkato' or Blue Earth River, with all its tributaries, to the water nymphs and their uncle in the German legend of Undine...No more appropriate name could be given the new city, than that of the noble river at whose mouth it is located." While it is uncertain that the city was intended to be called Mahkato, the Dakota called the river Makato Osa Watapa ("the river where blue earth is gathered"). The Anglo settlers adapted that as "Blue Earth River". Frederick Webb Hodge, in the Handbook of American Indians North of Mexico, said the town was named after the older of the two like-named chiefs of the Mdewakanton nation of the Santee Dakota, whose village stood on or near the site of the present town.

Ishtakhaba, also known as Chief Sleepy Eye, of the Sisseton band, was said to have directed settlers to this location. He said the site at the confluence of the Minnesota and Blue Earth Rivers was well suited to building and river traffic, and yet safe from flooding.

On December 26, 1862, United States Volunteers of the State of Minnesota carried out the largest mass execution in U.S. history at Mankato after the Dakota War of 1862. Companies of the 7th, 8th, 9th, 10th Minnesota Infantry Regiments, and Minnesota Cavalry oversaw the hanging of 38 men: 35 Santee Sioux and 3 biracial French/native American, for their involvement in the war crimes committed during the uprising. The crimes included intentional killings, mutilations and rapes of hundreds of unarmed civilians.  A USV military tribunal reviewed nearly 500 cases, of which 303 received a death sentence, but President Lincoln requested the court files. He reviewed them, placing the rape cases at the top, and pardoning 265. Episcopal Bishop Henry Benjamin Whipple urged leniency to which Lincoln responded that he had to take a balanced approach. His position and dismissals were unpopular in Minnesota. To commemorate the 50th anniversary of the event a large granite marker was erected that stood at the site until 1971, when the city took it down. Today, a different monument marks the execution site. Across the street are two monuments to the indigenous people in what it called Reconciliation Park. The Blue Earth County Library, Main street and Reconciliation Park cover the immediate vicinity of the execution site.

In 1880, Mankato was Minnesota's fourth-most populous city, with 5,500 residents.

Former Vice President Schuyler Colfax died while traveling through Mankato on January 13, 1885.

Geography
The Minnesota, Blue Earth, and Le Sueur rivers all flow through or near the city.

Climate

Mankato has a humid continental climate, type Dfa (hot summer subtype). Winters are cold, with snow cover (continuous most winter seasons) beginning typically between mid-November and mid-December, ending in March most years. However, Mankato often receives less snow than areas to its north and east. Dangerously low wind-chill temperatures are a significant hazard during the winter months, as Arctic air outbreaks rush into the area from Canada, borne on high winds; this can bring about ground blizzard conditions, especially in nearby rural areas. 

Summers are warm, with occasional but usually brief hot, humid periods, often interspersed with pushes of cooler air from Canada, often preceded by showers and thunderstorms. Precipitation falls year round, but falls mostly as snow from December to February, sometimes March, and as showers and thunderstorms during the warmer season, from May to September. Mankato's average wettest months are from June to August, with frequent thunderstorm activity. Mankato lies on the northern fringe of the central United States’ main tornado belt, with lower risk than in Iowa and Missouri to the south. The highest-risk months for severe thunderstorms and (rarely) tornadoes, are May through July. However, a very unusual early tornado outbreak affected areas within  of Mankato on March 29, 1998, when an F3 tornado hit St. Peter,  to Mankato's north. On August 17, 1946, tornadoes struck southwestern areas of Mankato and the town of Wells to the southeast, killing 11 people.

Demographics

2020 census
As of the census of 2020, there were 44,693 people and 17,196 households residing in the city. The city's racial makeup was 85.7% White, 6.9% African American, 0.1% Native American, 3.4% Asian, 1.3% from other races, and 2.6% from two or more races. Hispanic or Latino people of any race were 4.4% of the population. The city's gender makeup was 49.9% male and 50.1% female.

2010 census
As of the census of 2010, there were 39,309 people, 14,851 households, and 7,093 families residing in the city. The city's racial makeup was 89.9% White, 4.0% African American, 0.3% Native American, 2.8% Asian, 0.8% from other races, and 2.1% from two or more races. Hispanic or Latino people of any race were 2.9% of the population.

There were 14,851 households, of which 22.5% had children under the age of 18 living with them, 35.0% were married couples living together, 9.0% had a female householder with no husband present, 3.7% had a male householder with no wife present, and 52.2% were non-families. 30.9% of all households were made up of individuals, and 9.4% had someone living alone who was 65 years of age or older. The average household size was 2.35 and the average family size was 2.91.

The median age in the city was 25.4 years. 16.3% of residents were under the age of 18; 32.6% were between the ages of 18 and 24; 23.8% were from 25 to 44; 16.6% were from 45 to 64; and 10.6% were 65 years of age or older. The city's gender makeup was 50.0% male and 50.0% female.

2000 census
As of the census of 2000, there were 32,427 people, 12,367 households, and 6,059 families residing in the city. The city's racial makeup was 92.55% White, 1.90% African American, 0.34% Native American, 2.81% Asian, 0.10% Pacific Islander, 0.94% from other races, and 1.36% from two or more races. Hispanic or Latino people of any race were 2.22% of the population.

There were 12,367 households, of which 23.6% had children under the age of 18 living with them, 36.7% were married couples living together, 8.8% had a female householder with no husband present, and 51.0% were non-families. 32.2% of all households were made up of individuals, and 9.9% had someone living alone who was 65 years of age or older. The average household size was 2.31 and the average family size was 2.90.

16.9% of the city's residents were under the age of 18; 32.5% were between age 18 and 24; 23.9% were from 25 to 44; 15.4% were from 45 to 64; and 11.3% were age 65 or older. The median age was 25 years. For every 100 females, there were 96.7 males. For every 100 females age 18 and over, there were 95.5 males.

The city's median household income was $33,956, and the median family income was $47,297. Males had a median income of $30,889 versus $22,081 for females. The city's per capita income in 2010 was $25,772. About 8.5% of families and 19.0% of the population were below the poverty line, including 15.6% of those under age 18 and 11.8% of those age 65 or over. In 2010, the unemployment rate was 5.7%.

Economy

Top employers
According to the City's 2021 Annual Comprehensive Financial Report, the top employers in the city are:

Arts and culture

Major events
Minnesota State University was home to the Minnesota Vikings summer training camp for 52 years. The Vikings announced their training camp would move to Eagan starting in 2018.

Places of interest

The Betsy & Tacy Houses
Blue Earth County Courthouse, listed on the National Register of Historic Places (NRHP)
Federal Courthouse and Post Office (NRHP)
First National Bank of Mankato (NRHP)
First Presbyterian Church (NRHP)
Good Counsel Hill
Happy Chef original restaurant and company headquarters; Mankato also is home to the last surviving 36-foot Happy Chef statue
The Hubbard House Blue Earth County Historical Society – French Second Empire style built in 1871 (NRHP)
ISG Field, home of the Mankato Moondogs of the Northwoods League, a collegiate summer baseball league
The Cray Mansion (NRHP)
River Hills Mall
Sibley Park is a city park along the river in Mankato.
The Mayo Clinic Health System Event Center, an arena in downtown Mankato formerly operated under the names Mankato Civic Center, Midwest Wireless Civic Center, Alltel Center, Verizon Wireless Center, and Verizon Center

Library
The Blue Earth County Library, part of the Traverse des Sioux Library System, serves the city.

Government
Mankato is in Minnesota's 1st congressional district, represented by Brad Finstad. It is in Minnesota Senate district 19, represented by Nick Frentz, and Minnesota House district 19B, represented by Luke Frederick. Mankato voted overwhelmingly for Joe Biden in the 2020 presidential election.

Education

The Mankato Area Public Schools are consolidated to include the cities of Mankato, North Mankato, Eagle Lake, and Madison Lake. There are ten elementary schools (Franklin, Eagle Lake, Kennedy, Washington, Roosevelt, Jefferson, Monroe, Hoover, Rosa Parks, and Bridges); two middle schools (Dakota Meadows Middle School and Prairie Winds Middle School); and two high schools (Mankato West High School and Mankato East High School).

Mankato has four parochial schools: Loyola Catholic School, Immanuel Lutheran Grade School and High School (K–12), Mount Olive Lutheran School (K–8) and Risen Savior Lutheran School (K–8). There is also a public charter school, Kato Public Charter School. The alternative school Central High, on Fulton Street, is another educational option.

Higher education institutions
 Minnesota State University was opened as the second state normal school in 1868 and is the second largest university in the state of Minnesota by enrollment. With an annual operating budget of over $200 million, Minnesota State provides a net economic benefit of over $452 million annually to Minnesota's south-central region. It is one of the largest employers in the Mankato area.
 South Central College
 Bethany Lutheran College
 Rasmussen University

Media
The major daily newspaper in the area is the Mankato Free Press.

Television
KMNF-LD (NBC)
KEYC-TV (CBS)

Radio

FM

 89.1 FM, KTIS (AM), Christian talk and teaching
 89.7 FM, KMSU, college radio
 90.5 FM, KNGA, Minnesota Public Radio
 91.5 FM, KGAC, classical
 93.1 FM, KATO-FM, classic hits
 94.1 FM, KXLP, classic rock
 94.9 FM, KTIS-FM, contemporary Christian music
 95.3 FM, KCMP, adult album alternative
 95.7 FM, KMKO-FM, active rock
 96.7 FM, KDOG, top 40
 99.1 FM, KEEZ-FM, adult contemporary
 100.5 FM, KXAC, country
 101.5 FM, KEMJ, adult contemporary
 101.7 FM, KMKO-FM, active rock
 102.7 FM, KTOE, news/talk
 103.1 FM, KFSP, sport talk
 103.5 FM, KYSM-FM, country
 104.5 FM, KJLY, Christian
 105.1 FM, KCMP, adult album alternative
 105.5 FM, KRBI-FM, adult contemporary
 107.1 FM, KJLY, Christian

AM
 860, KNUJ (AM), news/talk
 1230, KFSP, sports talk
 1420, KTOE, news/talk

Infrastructure

Transportation
Public transportation in Mankato is provided by the Mankato Transit System. The city is served by Mankato Regional Airport, which has no commercial flights. Under MnDOT's 2015 State Rail Plan, Mankato is listed as a Tier 1 Corridor for regional rail service from Minneapolis and/or St. Paul. U.S. Highways 14 and 169 and Minnesota State Highways 22 and 60 are four of Mankato's main routes.

Major highways
The following routes are within the city of Mankato.
  U.S. Highway 14
  U.S. Highway 169
  Minnesota State Highway 22
  Minnesota State Highway 60

In popular culture
Mankato was the basis for Deep Valley in Maud Hart Lovelace's Betsy-Tacy series of children's books and novels. The children's/young adult wing of the Blue Earth County Library is named in her honor.

The protagonist of Sinclair Lewis's 1920 novel Main Street, Carol Milford, is a former Mankato resident. Lewis describes Mankato as follows: "In its garden-sheltered streets and aisles of elms is white and green New England reborn", alluding to its many migrants from New England, who brought their culture with them. Lewis wrote a substantial portion of the novel while staying at the J.W. Schmidt House at 315 South Broad Street, as now marked by a small plaque in front of the building.

In the Little House on the Prairie television series, Mankato is a trading town that the citizens of Walnut Grove visit. It does not appear in the Laura Ingalls Wilder books.

The 1972 film The New Land, a sequel to The Emigrants (1971), both by Swedish director Jan Troell, depicts the mass execution of 38 Dakota Indians at the end of the 1862 Dakota War.

In 1996, Don Descy created city-mankato.us as a teaching tool and example that not everything on the Internet should be believed.

Hotdish

In 2016 Food & Wine credited a 1930 Mankato church congregation cookbook as the first written record of a hotdish recipe. Many churches publish cookbooks with recipes submitted by their congregation as fund raisers. The source included neither the name of the woman who invented the recipe nor the source. Mankato resident Joyce Nelson had a copy of the 1930 Lutheran church recipe book and it was found that the recipe was indeed included in that year's cookbook. Mrs. C. W. Anderson had submitted a recipe for a "HOT DISH" made with hamburger, onions, Creamette pasta, celery, a can of peas, tomato soup and tomatoes.

Notable people

Barry Anderson, Associate Justice of the Minnesota Supreme Court
Walter Jackson Bate, Pulitzer Prize-winning biographer, born in Mankato in 1918
Daniel Buck, Minnesota jurist and politician
Con Bunde, Alaska state legislator and educator
Frederick Russell Burnham, "father of the international scouting movement" born near Mankato in 1861
Joseph Francis Busch, Roman Catholic prelate, Diocese of Rapid City, Diocese of Saint Cloud, Minnesota
Howard Burnham, mining engineer, born near Mankato in 1870
Jimmy Chin, professional climber and mountaineer, Academy Award winner for Best Documentary 
George Contant, outlaw of the American West, brother of John Sontag
Marvel Cooke, journalist, writer and civil rights activist
David R. Cummiskey, Minnesota legislator
Craig Dahl, NFL safety, New York Giants
Adolph Olson Eberhart, seventeenth Governor of Minnesota
William S. Ervin, Attorney General of Minnesota
Ronald G. Evans, Minnesota legislator and businessman
Cliff Fagan, basketball referee, Basketball Hall of Fame
Sal Frederick, Minnesota legislator and businessman
Kelly Gage, Minnesota legislator and lawyer
Albert P. Halfhill, tuna packing industry
Milton Hanna, Civil War veteran, Medal of Honor recipient
Justin Hartwig, former NFL center
Geoff Herbach, novelist
Robert Louis Hodapp, Roman Catholic bishop
Ron Johnson, Republican U.S. Senator 
Jack Kodell, stage magician
Sinclair Lewis, author
Mike Lindell, founder of MyPillow
Maud Hart Lovelace, author of the Betsy-Tacy series of books
Bob Paffrath, professional football player
Mark Piepho, Minnesota politician and businessman
Mike Ploog, comic book and film-production artist
Edmund Mann Pope, United States military officer, businessman, and Minnesota state senator
Dudley Riggs, Brave New Workshop, graduated from Minnesota State University Mankato
Joseph Rosser, Secretary of Minnesota Territory and lawyer
Daniel L. Ryan, Roman Catholic bishop
Ervin Harold Schulz, businessman, newspaper editor, and Minnesota politician
Roy F. Schulz, farmer and Minnesota politician
Julia Sears, pioneering feminist and suffragette
John Sontag, outlaw, born in Mankato; crimes in Minnesota and California
Steven B. Szarke, born in Mankato, Minnesota state legislator and lawyer
Glen Taylor, owner of the Minnesota Timberwolves and Minnesota Lynx basketball teams
John Eaton Tourtellotte, lawyer, Civil War general
Adam Thielen, NFL wide receiver, Minnesota Vikings, graduated from Minnesota State University
Arthur S. Thomas, Chief of Chaplains of the US Air Force
Alma Wagen, first female guide at Mount Rainier National Park
Tim Walz, 41st Governor of Minnesota, former US Representative for Minnesota's 1st congressional district
Cedric Yarbrough, actor, graduated from Minnesota State University
Steve Zahn, actor and comedian, was raised in Mankato

See also
 National Register of Historic Places listings in Blue Earth County, Minnesota

References

External links

City of Mankato official website
Mankato Chamber of Commerce
Greater Mankato Convention & Visitors Bureau 

 
Cities in Blue Earth County, Minnesota
Cities in Le Sueur County, Minnesota
Cities in Nicollet County, Minnesota
Mankato – North Mankato metropolitan area 
Cities in Minnesota
County seats in Minnesota
Dakota toponyms
1852 establishments in Minnesota Territory